QE2 usually refers to the ocean liner Queen Elizabeth 2.

QE2 may also refer to:

Astronomical objects
 (7168) 1986 QE2, a main-belt minor planet
 (10083) 1990 QE2, a main-belt minor planet
 (7827) 1992 QE2, a main-belt minor planet
 (14534) 1997 QE2, a main-belt minor planet
 (285263) 1998 QE2, a near-Earth asteroid

Other uses
 QE2 (album), by Mike Oldfield, 1980
 QE2 (monetary policy), a second round of quantitative easing
 Elizabeth II, former monarch before Charles III in 2022

See also
 Elizabeth II (disambiguation)
 List of things named after Elizabeth II
 QE (disambiguation)
 QE1 (disambiguation)
 QE3 (disambiguation)